Albert Dikwa Lega (born 2 January 1998) is a Cameroonian footballer who currently plays for Pittsburgh Riverhounds SC in the USL Championship.

Career

Orlando City B 
Dikwa signed with United Soccer League side Orlando City B on 9 February 2017. He made his professional debut on 25 March 2017 at a 74th-minute substitute in a 1–0 loss to Tampa Bay Rowdies. Dikwa scored his first professional goal on April 9, 2017, during a 1-1 draw with Charlotte Independence.

Saint Louis FC 
Dikwa signed with USL side Saint Louis FC on 15 December 2017. Dikwa made his debut for Saint Louis on March 24, 2018, coming on as a substitution for Austin Martz in a 2-1 loss against San Antonio FC. Dikwa scored his first goal for Saint Louis on May 9, 2018, during a 6-3 loss to Los Angeles Galaxy II.

Pittsburgh Riverhounds SC
In August 2020, Dikwa joined USL Championship side Pittsburgh Riverhounds SC. He made his debut and scored his first goal for the club on 1 September 2020, in a 3–0 win against Loudoun United. On April 12, 2022, Dikwa was named USL Championship Player of the week for Week 5 of the 2022 season, after notching a goal and an assist in a 4-3 victory over FC Tulsa.

Career statistics

References

External links
 

1998 births
Living people
Cameroonian footballers
Orlando City B players
Saint Louis FC players
Pittsburgh Riverhounds SC players
USL Championship players
Cameroonian expatriate sportspeople in the United States
Association football forwards
Cameroonian expatriate footballers
Expatriate soccer players in the United States
Montverde Academy alumni